Glavine is a surname. Notable people with the surname include:

 Leo Glavine (born 1948), Canadian politician
 Mike Glavine (born 1973), American baseball player and coach
 Tom Glavine (born 1966), American Major League Baseball pitcher, member of the Baseball Hall of Fame